The Fallon County Jail is a site on the National Register of Historic Places located in Baker, Montana.  It was added to the Register on July 31, 1998.  The building is now a part of the O'Fallon Historical Museum.  The main attraction in the building is Steer Montana, the world's largest steer.  It weighs 3,980 pounds.

References

County government buildings in Montana
Jails on the National Register of Historic Places in Montana
National Register of Historic Places in Fallon County, Montana